Zamprogna is a surname. It is a northern Italian last name , although not common.  Fewer than sixty families have this surname in Italy.  

Notable people with the surname include:

Dominic Zamprogna (born 1979), Canadian actor
Gema Zamprogna (born 1976), Canadian actress